Dagobert II (died 679) was a Merovingian king of the Franks, ruling in Austrasia from 675 or 676 until his death. He is one of the more obscure Merovingians. He has been considered a martyr since at least the ninth century.

None of the narrative histories of the Merovingian period give an account of Dagobert's reign, which must be reconstructed from several different sources. Upon the death of his father in 656, he was deprived of the succession and exiled to Ireland to live as a monk. His return to Austrasia was arranged by Wilfrid, bishop of York. He ascended the throne following the assassination of his cousin in 675. During his brief reign he made war on the neighbouring Frankish kingdom of Neustria, signed a peace treaty with the Lombard Kingdom in Italy and reintroduced gold coinage.

The only near-contemporary assessment of Dagobert's character portrays him as a tyrant. He antagonized the bishops and imposed new taxes. He was assassinated by a conspiracy of the highest nobility. He was succeeded by his cousin, Theuderic III, king of Neustria, against whom he had previously warred.

Exile
Dagobert was the son of Sigebert III (ruled 632–51/6) and an unknown woman. It is unlikely that he was a son of Sigebert's only known wife, Chimnechild, who survived him. He was thus the half-brother of Bilichild, Chimnechild's daughter by Sigebert. He was named for his grandfather, Dagobert I (623–39).

According to the Book of the History of the Franks, which dates to 727, after Sigebert's death, Grimoald, the mayor of the palace and the most powerful official under the king, arranged for Dagobert to be tonsured and placed in the custody of Dido, bishop of Poitiers. Tonsuring rendered Dagobert unfit for the throne, since Merovingian kings always wore their hair long. Dido then sent Dagobert to Ireland. The dating of these events is uncertain. They are usually placed in 656, but a date as early as 651 has also been proposed.

No contemporary source describes Dagobert's time in Ireland. The eighteenth-century antiquary Mervyn Archdall was the first to record the association of Dagobert with a specific place in Ireland. He wrote that a local oral tradition current at that time put Dagobert in the monastery of Slane, a conclusion accepted by some modern scholars.

Grimoald placed his own son, Childebert, on the Austrasian throne, but the Neustrians under Clovis II (639–657) had Grimoald arrested and brought to Paris, where he was executed "because he had acted against his lord", that is, the rightful Merovingian claimant. Clovis's second son, Childeric II, who was still a minor, was placed on the Austrasian throne in 662. He was married to Bilichild, Dagobert's half-sister, and placed under the regency of Chimnechild. He was assassinated, along with his queen and his son, in 675.

The murder of Childeric provided the occasion for Dagobert's return, but its immediate result was civil war. The former mayor of the palace, Ebroin, declared a certain Clovis III, son of the Neustrian king Chlothar III (658–673), as king in Austrasia, while Clovis II's third son, Theuderic III, was placed on the Neustrian throne by Leodegar. After Leodegar's capture, Ebroin abandoned Clovis for Theuderic, and in so doing lost his Austrasian allies. In this situation, Dagobert was recalled from his Irish exile.

Return from exile
While the Book of the History of the Franks is the only source to describe the circumstances of Dagobert's exile, the Life of Wilfrid is the only one to describe his return. This biography of the English bishop Wilfrid was composed in the first decades of the eighth century by Stephen of Ripon. According to Stephen, Dagobert was exiled to Ireland "in his youth" and when his friends and relatives later learned that he was still living they asked Wilfrid to bring him to England and from there send him on to Austrasia.

The Life of Wilfrid does not specify who was responsible for recalling Dagobert, only that it was "friends" (amici) and "relatives" (proximi). The relatives may have been on his mother's side. There is little consensus on who the friends could have been, possibly Wulfoald, the former mayor of the palace; Pippin of Herstal and Martin of Laon, who came to power, according to the Book of the History of the Franks, after "the deaths of kings", perhaps in 675; or even Ultan, abbot of Saint-Maur-des-Fossés, who was Irish himself and had connections in Ireland.

The exact date of Dagobert's accession is not known. Childeric II was killed in 675 and Dagobert was on the throne by July 676.

Reign

Dagobert's reign is sparsely recorded. The Book of the History of the Franks, which has a Neustrian perspective, does not mention him again after describing his exile. The historian Richard Gerberding says of the History's author, "Either he did not believe that Dagobert had returned to become king or he did not want us to know of it". Paul Fouracre suggests that he did not regard Dagobert as a legitimate king, either because he had not been chosen with the support of the Neustrians; because he was considered a foreigner after his long exile; or because he was not considered throneworthy on account of the circumstances of his birth, his mother having been a concubine.

Only one seventh-century work from within the Merovingian kingdoms, the Life of Abbess Sadalberga of Laon, mentions the reign of Dagobert, and then only in passing. It records that Sadalberga moved her convent from the suburbs of Langres in northern Burgundy to the city of Laon because of forebodings, later proven true by "recent fighting between Kings Dagobert and Theuderic". This is the only mention of a war between Dagobert and his first cousin, Theuderic III of Neustria. It is an indication of the continuing animosity between Ebroin and the Austrasians, although it may have begun as a border dispute in the Champagne.

That the war was waged deep in Burgundy, which was under Neustrian rule, suggests that Dagobert for a time had the initiative. It may be during this war that Pippin of Herstal and Martin of Laon launched the attack on Theuderic III that was defeated by Ebroin at the famous Battle of Lucofao, resulting in Martin's death. While this battle may have taken place after Dagobert's death, a more likely date is September 679, when Dagobert was still alive and able to issue orders for the raising of levies. The war mentioned in the Life, however, cannot be dated precisely. It may have ended as early as September 677.

In 676, Dagobert signed a "most firm pact of peace" with the Lombards. This event can be dated precisely because the only source for it, the History of the Lombards written by Paul the Deacon towards the end of the eighth century, reports the appearance of a comet in August the same year. This comet was widely reported across the world from Ireland to Japan. Paul, however, mistakenly places the pact in the reign of the Lombard king Grimoald, who died in 671, before Dagobert had even returned from Ireland. The Lombard king at the time of the comet was actually Perctarit.

The only surviving authentic charter issued by Dagobert confirms the possessions of the monastery of Stavelot-Malmedy. In the charter Dagobert refers to the donations made by his father, but does not mention that the monastery was founded by Grimoald, the man who had exiled him.

Dagobert reintroduced the minting of gold, which had apparently been suspended by Childeric II around 670. His gold tremissis broke with the old Frankish style and copied the cross potent on three steps of contemporary Byzantine solidi. Dagobert was also the last king in whose name coins were struck in Marseille. The important royal coinage of Marseille, lasting from 613 until 679, was always struck with the name of a king, which was unusual since Frankish coins typically contain only the names of the moneyer and the mint.

In 679, while on his way to Rome to attend a church council, Wilfrid stayed at the court of Dagobert, who was grateful to the bishop for having facilitated his return from Ireland. Dagobert offered to appoint Wilfrid to the diocese of Strasbourg, which the Life of Wilfrid calls the "chief bishopric of his realm", but Wilfrid declined. Dagobert provided him with arms and companions for the rest of his journey to Rome. In Italy, Wilfrid stayed for a time at the court of Dagobert's new ally, Perctarit.

In late 679, shortly after Wilfrid's visit, Dagobert was assassinated. The Life of Wilfrid claims that this was engineered by "treacherous dukes" with the consent of the bishops. According to a late tradition, he was killed by his own godson, John, while hunting in the Woëvre. The traditional date of his death, 23 December, is likewise based on late sources but widely accepted.

Following Dagobert's death, Ebroin managed to extend Theuderic III's authority over Austrasia. On Wilfrid's return trip through Austrasia in 680, he was arrested by Ebroin's men, who blamed him for having arranged Dagobert's return. According to the report in the Life, Dagobert was a "destroyer of cities, despising the counsels of the magnates, reducing the people with taxation ... being contemptuous of God's churches and their bishops." It is possible that the reference to the destruction of cities refers to Dagobert's failure to protect them when Ebroin devastated the land after his victory at Lucofao.

Martyr cult

The Life of Wilfrid is the only source to record Dagobert's assassination, but some corroboration comes from the fact that he was being revered as a martyr in the Ardennes region before the end of the ninth century.

There are conflicting claims about where Dagobert was buried. According to the Life of Bishop Audoin of Rouen, written in the early eighth century, Dagobert was buried in the church of Saint Peter in Rouen alongside his predecessor, Childeric II, and Childeric's queen, Bilichild, and infant son, also named Dagobert. This source refers to the "Dagobert whom Grimoald tonsured" without mentioning his exile, return or reign.

The Life of Dagobert, on the other hand, says that Dagobert was buried at Stenay in the church dedicated to Saint Remigius. This is not implausible, since Stenay was in the centre of Austrasia. The source, however, dates to the 890s and confuses Dagobert II and Dagobert III (711–715), who died of illness.

In 872, the cult of Dagobert was brought to life (or revived) by Charles the Bald, king of West Francia (840–877), who had his relics translated to a specially built basilica in Stenay staffed with its own canons. The timing seems to indicate that Charles was trying to establish himself in that part of Lotharingia that he had only acquired in 870 by the Treaty of Meerssen. The translation of the relics is mentioned in the Life of Dagobert and in a charter preserved in the cartulary of the Abbey of Gorze, which provides the date.

The endowment of the Basilica of Saint Dagobert is known from a charter of 1124, also in the cartulary of Gorze. The endowment had passed at some point to Beatrice, wife of Godfrey III, Duke of Lower Lorraine, who in 1069 left it to the abbey of Gorze. The canons having grown lax, the monks turned it into a Benedictine priory.

Dagobert's feast day was 23 December. This day is given in the Life of Dagobert; in the now lost calendar of saints made for Emma, wife of King Lothair of France (954–986); and in the auctaria (local additions) to the Martyrology of Usuard from the area of modern Belgium. One auctarium, however, places his feast on 11 September. A Liège manuscript of the martyrology of Ado of Vienne also places Dagobert's death on 23 December.

Dagobert's festival was never widespread outside of Stenay. Generally, it became associated with places associated with Dagobert I. It was still being celebrated at Verdun as late as the sixteenth century. The prior of Stenay was suppressed in 1580 and in 1591 the buildings were sacked by Protestants. Dagobert's relics were dispersed, with some ending up in Saint-Ghislain.

Notes

References

Bibliography

679 deaths
7th-century Frankish saints
7th-century murdered monarchs
7th-century rulers in Europe
Christian royal saints
Roman Catholic royal saints
Frankish warriors
Merovingian kings
Priory of Sion hoax